Jai Bajarangabali is a 2014 Indian Kannada-language action drama film directed by Ravivarma Gubbi and starring Ajai Rao and Sindhu Loknath.

Cast 
Ajai Rao as Ajju
Sindhu Loknath as Ambuja
Anant Nag 
Shobharaj
P. Ravishankar
Tennis Krishna
Bullet Prakash

Production 
The film began production in 2012. This is Ajai Rao's first action film and he plays a Hanuman devotee. Sindhu Loknath plays a non-resident Indian in the film and worked on this film around the same time as Love in Mandya (2014). The film was shot in Bangalore and Kuala Lumpur.

Soundtrack 
The music is composed by V. Harikrishna.
"Hrudayada Battery"

Reception 
A critic from The Times of India gave the film a rating of three out of film and praised the direction, the performance of the cast, the dialogues, the music and the cinematography. A critic from Bangalore Mirror opined that "Jai Bhajaranga Bali is still one of those films that will not make you want to run away from theatre". A critic from Filmibeat stated that "Jai Bajarangbali is a below average movie and definitely not worth watching in theatre".

References